Enrico Piovanello (born 20 April 2000) is an Italian professional footballer who plays as a striker for  club Padova.

Career

Padova 
Piovanello made his debut in professional football in the 2017–18 season, helping Padova to be promoted to the 2018–19 Serie B. He also won the 2019 Supercoppa di Serie C. In the 2018–19 season, Piovanello moved to Bari which played in Serie D. He made 34 appearances and scored three goals. In the 2019–20 season, Piovanello returned to Padova and made nine appearances with no goals. In the 2020–21 season, Piovanello was loaned to Catania. He made his team debut on 26 October 2020, in a match against Teramo. In Catania he made nine appearances: 260 minutes and no goals. On 6 January 2021, Piovanello moved to Imolese on loan. Piovanello made with Imolese two goals in 18 appearances.

On 20 August 2021, he was loaned to Serie C club Mantova.

Style of play 
Piovanello has good technique and a strong dribbling ability.

External links

References 

2000 births
Living people
Sportspeople from Padua
Italian footballers
Association football forwards
Serie C players
Serie D players
Calcio Padova players
S.S.C. Bari players
Catania S.S.D. players
Imolese Calcio 1919 players
Mantova 1911 players
Footballers from Veneto